Jessica S. Lappin (born April 25, 1975) is a New York City business leader and a former member of the New York City Council from the 5th district. In 2014, she became the president of the Alliance for Downtown New York, a Business Improvement District.

Career
On February 3, 2014, Lappin was appointed as president at the Alliance for Downtown New York, the organization that manages the Downtown-Lower Manhattan Business Improvement District. Lappin also serves as the President of its sister organization, the Downtown-Lower Manhattan Association.

Political career
Lappin served two terms as a member of the New York City Council, representing Manhattan's fifth district, which includes the Upper East Side, East Midtown, and Roosevelt Island. She previously worked as a senior adviser and District Chief of Staff to Gifford Miller, the former Speaker of the New York City Council and representative of Manhattan's fifth district. She also ran in the Democratic Primary for Manhattan Borough President in 2013 and finished in second place.

Personal life
Lappin, who is Jewish, was raised in Manhattan. She graduated from Stuyvesant High School and attended Georgetown University, graduating magna cum laude.

Lappin married Andrew Wuertele in 2003.

The couple has two children, Lucas and Miles.

References

External links
 Jessica Lappin biography | Alliance for Downtown New York

Living people
Jewish American people in New York (state) politics
New York (state) Democrats
Georgetown University alumni
New York City Council members
Stuyvesant High School alumni
Women New York City Council members
21st-century American Jews
21st-century American women
1975 births